Pavlína Němcová (born 18 February 1972 in Děčín, Czechoslovak Socialist Republic) is a Czech model, actress and producer.

Biography 
Němcová enrolled into the Actors Studio in New York, taking Jack Waltzer's classes for one year. After acting in a few American independent film projects, such as Salome’s Kiss and Damaged, and playing small parts in European films like Colditz and Modern Love, Němcová obtained the role of the American journalist who interviews Edith Piaf/Marion Cotillard in La Vie en Rose.  She was then cast as Olga in La Guerre des Miss  – The War of the Beauty Queens, released in France in January 2009. An Italian drama from Roberto Faenza filmed in English immediately followed: The Case of Unfaithfull Klara.

Filmography

References

External links 
Pavlína Němcová Website

Living people
1973 births
Czech film actresses
People from Děčín
Czech female models
21st-century Czech actresses